NCND may refer to:

 "Neither Confirm Nor Deny", the Glomar response to a US Freedom of Information Act
 Neither confirming nor denying, in U.S. security policy; See Iowa-class battleship
 Neither Confirm Nor Deny, a policy regarding UK Defence Nuclear Material Transport Operations
 Non-Circumvent and Non-Disclosure; See List of business and finance abbreviations
 Non-circumvent agreement
 Non-disclosure agreement